Joseph or Joe Wilson may refer to:

Politicians and government officials

United States
Joe Wilson (American politician) (born 1947), U.S. Representative from South Carolina
Joseph C. Wilson (1949–2019), United States ambassador and husband of Valerie Plame Wilson
Joseph G. Wilson (1826–1873), U.S. Representative from Oregon
Joseph Franklin Wilson (1901–1968), U.S. Representative from Texas
Joe N. Wilson (1922–2015), American politician from Iowa
Joseph Harvey Wilson (1810–1884), American politician from North Carolina
Joseph S. Wilson, U.S. Treasury and Department of the Interior official
Joseph T. Wilson (died 1891), American politician, journalist, and author

United Kingdom
Joe Wilson (British politician) (born 1937), Member of the European Parliament for North Wales (1989–99)
Joseph Havelock Wilson (1859–1929), British trade union leader and politician

New Zealand
Joseph Vivian Wilson (1894–1977), New Zealand ambassador to France

Sportsmen

Football
Joe Wilson (footballer, born 1861) (1861–1952), played at outside left for Stoke, Aston Villa and West Bromwich Albion
Joe Wilson (footballer, born 1883) (1883–1945), played at centre half for Blackburn Rovers, Brighton & Hove Albion and Millwall
Joe Wilson (footballer, born 1909) (1909–1984), played at inside right for Newcastle United and Brighton & Hove Albion
Joe Wilson (footballer, born 1911) (1911–1996), played at right back for Southend United, Brentford, Barnsley and others
Joe Wilson (footballer, born 1937) (1937–2015), played at full back for Nottingham Forest and Wolverhampton Wanderers
Joe Wilson (1920s and 1930s footballer), played for Gillingham and Walsall
Joseph Wilson (football manager), known as "Bill" Wilson, a Guyanese professional football manager
Joe Wilson (Australian footballer) (1870–1912), Australian rules footballer and cricketer
Joseph Wilson (footballer) (born 1939), Ghanaian footballer
Joe Wilson (American football) (born 1950), American football running back

Other sports
Joseph Peter Wilson (1935–2019), American Olympic cross-country skier
Joseph Wilson (Australian cricketer) (1869–1938), Australian cricketer
Joseph Wilson (English cricketer) (born 1965), English cricketer

Arts
Joe Wilson (Geordie singer) (1841–1875), Geordie dialect singer, songwriter
Joe Wilson (musician), member of the British band Sneaker Pimps
Joe Lee Wilson (1935–2011), American gospel-influenced jazz singer
Joe Wilson (director) (born 1964), American film director and producer

Religion
Joseph Bearwalker Wilson (1942–2004), shamanist and founder of the 1734 tradition of witchcraft
Joseph Ruggles Wilson (1822–1903), theologian and father of Woodrow Wilson

Business
Joseph C. Wilson (entrepreneur) (1909–1971), founder of the Xerox Corporation
Joseph Lapsley Wilson (1844–1928), American railroad executive, author and horticulturalist
J. W. Wilson (Joseph William Wilson, 1829–1898), English engineer

Fiction
Joe Wilson (character), a fictional character appearing in numerous Henry Lawson short stories
Joe Wilson (miniseries), a 1988 mini series about the character
Jericho (DC Comics), also known as Joseph William Wilson, a fictional comic book superhero

Wilson, Joseph